Gynacantha dravida, also known as Indian duskhawker or brown darner, is a species of dragonfly in the family Aeshnidae. It is found in India and Sri Lanka.

Description and habitat
It is a large dragonfly characterized by its homogeneous colouring of dull browns and greens, by its long and thin anal appendages, and by its crepuscular habits. Its principal food appears to be mosquitoes and microlepidoptera. During the day it rests in dark thickets. Fully matured specimens have bright colours; blues and greens developing very late in life. Young specimens have brown color with some dark shades. Females are exactly similar to the males in colors and markings.

It is very closely related to Gynacantha  subinterrupta and it is difficult to distinguish them. But the relative lengths of the superior and inferior anal appendages are different. The inferior being more than one-third the length of superiors in G. dravida and less than one-third in G. subinterrupta.

See also
 List of odonates of India
 List of odonates of Sri Lanka
 List of odonata of Kerala

References

External links
 
 
 Animal diversity web

Aeshnidae
Insects described in 1960